The VMI Keydets football team competes in the Southern Conference of the National Collegiate Athletic Association and the Football Championship Subdivision, representing the Virginia Military Institute in Lexington, Virginia. Since its inception in 1891, the program has had 30 head coaches.

Although the origins of VMI football date back to 1873, the first organized football team did not appear until 1891. The first head coach was Walter Taylor, the son of Walter H. Taylor, a prominent banker, lawyer, and aide-de-camp to Robert E. Lee. Notable coaches include Blandy Clarkson, who spent seven seasons with the Keydets and led the team to their first undefeated season in 1920; John McKenna, the school's all-time most victorious coach who compiled a record of 62–60–8 in thirteen seasons with VMI while winning four Southern Conference championships; and Bob Thalman, the second most victorious coach who led the team to the 1974 and 1977 conference titles. The most recent Keydet head coach was Sparky Woods, who coached seven seasons for the Keydets before being let go by the school in 2014.

In over 120 years of football, VMI has an all-time record of 465–657–42 (.418). The team has not had a winning season since 1981 (they had even 6–6 seasons in 2002 and 2003), and has yet to make the FCS playoffs since the subdivision's inception in 1978.

Key

Coaches

Notes

References
General
2013 VMI Football Record Book

Specific

 
Lists of college football head coaches
VMI Keydets football coaches